Colleen Atkinson is a camogie player, captain of the Wexford team that won the 2011 All-Ireland Intermediate Camogie Championship

Other awards
National Camogie League medals in 2009, 2010 and 2011; National League Division two 2009; Winner of All-Ireland Senior medals in 2007; 
Leinster Junior 2003 (captain), 2004; Leinster Senior 2003, 2004, 2007; Club Senior 2003, 2004, 2005, 2006, 2007 (captain), 2009; Leinster Club Senior 2009. All-Ireland club sevens 2006. Colleen's younger sister, Karen is also on the Wexford panel.

References

External links
 Camogie.ie Official Camogie Association Website
 Wexford Wexford camogie site

1986 births
Living people
Wexford camogie players